Ahmadabad-e Garus (also Romanized as Aḩmadābād-e Garūs; also known as Aḩmadābād) is a village in Qaflankuh-e Sharqi Rural District, Kaghazkonan District, Meyaneh County, East Azerbaijan Province, Iran. At the 2006 census, its population was 516, in 116 families.

References 

Populated places in Meyaneh County